Buy Me Blue Ribbons was a 1951 play by Australian writer Sumner Locke Elliott. It was one of the few Broadway plays to be written by an Australian.

The original production was co produced by the actor Jay Robinson, who also appeared in the cast.

The play was not well received critically and only ran 13 performances. However it was played in Sydney in 1953 and adapted for television in 1954.

References

External links
 
 

Australian plays
1951 plays